Fusivermidae is a family of nematodes belonging to the order Monhysterida.

Genera:
 Fusivermis Tchesunov, 1996

References

Nematodes